Corinth is an unincorporated community in Montague County, Texas, United States. The community never consisted of more than a community church, which served as a meeting place and school for the numerous farming families that lived in the north central Montague County area. In 1982, the old church collapsed after years of disuse. Nothing remains of the community.

References

Unincorporated communities in Montague County, Texas
Unincorporated communities in Texas